Nicholas "Nicky" Christopher Andrew Parkes (born 11 February 1990) is a Scottish field hockey player who plays as a midfielder for English club Surbiton and the Scottish national team.

He represented Scotland in the 2014 Commonwealth Games at Glasgow and the 2018 Gold Coast Commonwealth Games. In August 2019, he was selected in the Scotland squad for the 2019 EuroHockey Championship.

References

External links

1990 births
Living people
Male field hockey midfielders
Commonwealth Games competitors for Scotland
Scottish male field hockey players
Field hockey players at the 2014 Commonwealth Games
Field hockey players at the 2018 Commonwealth Games
Surbiton Hockey Club players
Men's England Hockey League players
Place of birth missing (living people)